Wiggins is an unincorporated community in Covington County, Alabama, United States. The community now lies within the city limits of Babbie.

History
The community was named for James Wiggins, who served as the first postmaster.  A post office operated under the name Wiggins from 1880 to 1904.

References

Unincorporated communities in Covington County, Alabama
Unincorporated communities in Alabama